Roger Louret (20 May 1950 – 25 January 2023) was a French actor, playwright, and theatre director.

Biography
He was the founder and artistic director of the theatre company . In 1985, he created La Nuit du Théâtre, followed by La Nuit des Hélènes in 1987 and La Nuit de l’Histoire in 1989.

Louret died in Villeneuve-sur-Lot on 25 January 2023, at the age of 72.

References

1950 births
2023 deaths
French stage actors
Musical theatre directors
French theatre directors
French male dramatists and playwrights
20th-century French male writers
20th-century French male actors
20th-century French dramatists and playwrights
21st-century French male writers
21st-century French male actors
21st-century French dramatists and playwrights
People from Lot-et-Garonne